Northwind  may refer to:

Companies
 Shorthand for Northern Power Systems, a wind energy company
 Northwind (company), a Canadian computer software company that develops property management systems

Music
 Northwind (album), album by the Swedish band Falconer
Northwinds, the second solo album by David Coverdale

Other
 Northwind (Australian rules football team), Canada's national Australian rules football team
 Northwind (comics), a fictional character in the DC Universe
 USCGC Northwind (WAGB-282), a United States Coast Guard icebreaker
 Northwind Glacier, a large glacier in Antarctica
Northwind Traders: a database sample that is shipped along with Microsoft Access application.

See also
North wind